KSOO (1000 AM, "ESPN Sioux Falls") is a radio station broadcasting a sports format, with programming from ESPN Radio. The station serves the Sioux Falls, South Dakota, area. The station is currently owned by Townsquare Media.

History
On August 7, 2017, KXRB and its classic country format moved to 1140 AM, swapping frequencies and call signs with news/talk-formatted KSOO.

On August 1, 2021, KSOO flipped to sports, branded as "ESPN Sioux Falls"; the format moved from KSOO-FM, which switched to country.

Honors and awards
In May 2006, KXRB won one first-place plaque in the commercial radio division of the South Dakota Associated Press Broadcasters Association news contest. The contest was for the 2005 calendar year.

Previous logos

References

External links
KSOO official website

FCC History Cards for KSOO

SOO (AM)
Sports radio stations in the United States
Radio stations established in 1969
1969 establishments in South Dakota
Townsquare Media radio stations
ESPN Radio stations